The winter campaign of 1941–1942 from 5 December 1941 to 7 May 1942 was the name given by Soviet military command to the period that marked the commencement of the Moscow Strategic Offensive Operation (better known as the Battle of Moscow). The opening phase of the Red Army strategic counter-offensive operations in the Soviet Union was a major albeit costly Soviet victory.

The campaign began with the Moscow Strategic Offensive Operation (5 December 1941 – 7 January 1942) with the simultaneous Kerch-Feodosia Amphibious Operation (25 December 1941 – 2 January 1942)

The operations in central and northern European Russia began with the conclusion of the Moscow counter-offensive almost simultaneously with the Oboyan–Kursk Offensive Operation (3 January 1942 – 26 January 1942), the Lyuban Offensive Operation (7 January 1942 – 30 April 1942), the Demyansk Offensive Operation (7 January 1942 – 20 May 1942), the Orel–Bolkhov Offensive Operation (8 January 1942 – 28 April 1942), and the Rzhev-Vyazma Strategic Offensive Operation (8 January 1942 – 20 April 1942). (not to be confused with Operation Mars, which refers to another Soviet operation in the same area, during November and December 1942). 

The campaign concluded with the Barvenkovo-Lozovaya Offensive Operation (18 January 1942 – 31 January 1942), a renewed attempt to retake Crimea during the Crimean Offensive Operation (27 January 1942 – 15 April 1942) and the Bolkhov Offensive Operation (24 March 1942 – 3 April 1942).

Notes

References

 

Conflicts in 1941
1941 in the Soviet Union
Conflicts in 1942
1942 in the Soviet Union
Battles and operations of the Eastern Front of World War II
Battles of World War II involving Germany
Battles involving Russia